The Women's 4 x 100 metre medley relay event at the 2013 Southeast Asian Games took place on 13 December 2013 at Wunna Theikdi Aquatics Centre.

There were 5 teams who took part in this event. Singapore won the gold medal,  Thailand and Malaysia won the silver and bronze medal respectively.

Schedule
All times are Myanmar Standard Time (UTC+06:30)

Records

Results

References

External links

Swimming at the 2013 Southeast Asian Games
Women's 4 × 100 metre medley relay
2013 in women's swimming